"Victory" is an old fight song of the Pennsylvania State University. It is most often sung by the Penn State Glee Club and performed by the Penn State Blue Band.

While a Penn State student and Glee Club member in 1913, James Leyden began singing a song he had just created at the athletic Track House. His roommate, Albert A. Hansen, published the song in the fall semester of 1913. The Blue Band played an arrangement of the song as early as 1915. During a Penn State Nittany Lions football game at Beaver Field against Lehigh University, students held aloft blue and white streamers and alternated the colors with the beats of the song; the novel cheering method became popular with the spectators in the crowd.

Leyden would later compose "The Nittany Lion" in the 1920s.

Lyrics
The song's lyrics are:

References

External links
Mp3 of "Victory", performed by the Penn State Glee Club

American college songs
College fight songs in the United States
Penn State Nittany Lions fight songs
1913 songs